The 2009–10 Fresno State Bulldogs men's basketball team represented Fresno State University during the 2009–10 college basketball season. This was head coach Steve Cleveland's fifth season at Fresno State. The Bulldogs played their home games at the Save Mart Center and were members of the Western Athletic Conference. Fresno State finished the season 15–18, 7–9 in WAC play and lost in the quarterfinals of the 2010 WAC men's basketball tournament to New Mexico State.

Pre-season
In the WAC preseason polls, released October 20 via media teleconference Fresno State was selected to finish 6th in the coach's poll and 7th in the media poll. Sr. Sylvester Seay was selected to the coache's All-WAC second team.

2009–10 Team

Roster
Source

Coaching Staff

2009–10 schedule and results

|-
!colspan=9 style=| Exhibition

|-
!colspan=9 style=| Regular Season

|-
!colspan=9 style=| WAC tournament

References

Fresno State
Fresno State Bulldogs men's basketball seasons
Fresno State Bulldogs men's bask
Fresno State Bulldogs men's bask